The Cecil Ranch, in Grimes, California in Colusa County, California, United States, was listed on the National Register of Historic Places in 2004.

It is a complex of buildings mostly dating from around the 1909 construction year of the main house.

The main house is a two-and-a-half-story woodframe house upon a brick foundation.  It was designed by Sacramento architect Alden Campbell and is somewhat similar to other houses he designed in that city, but is unusual in its rural area. It reflects a mix of architectural styles: Queen Anne in its variation of exterior sheathing textures for each story, Craftsman for its clinker brick porch bases, secondary story base, chimney, and some of the bracketing, and Colonial Revival for its Tuscan columns, balustrades, enclosed gables and "rather trim formal image".

Its address is 1840 CA 45 in Grimes.  The complex is located on what is now an oxbow lake named Cecil Lake, which was formerly a bend in the Sacramento River, altered by levees.

References

Ranches in California
Colonial Revival architecture in California
Queen Anne architecture in California
American Craftsman architecture in California
National Register of Historic Places in Colusa County, California
Buildings and structures completed in 1909